Man, Woman and Wife is a 1929 American drama film directed by Edward Laemmle and starring Norman Kerry, Pauline Starke and Marian Nixon. It was based on a short story called Fallen Angels, and the film was also sometimes known by this title. It was originally made as a silent film, before a soundtrack and sound effects were added to it.

Cast
 Norman Kerry as Rance Rogers / Ralph Brandon  
 Pauline Starke as Julia / Rita  
 Marian Nixon as Bella Rogers / Helen Brandon  
 Byron Douglas as Senator Blake / Senator Blake  
 Kenneth Harlan as Bill / Jack Mason 
 Crauford Kent as Wade / Ward Rogers

References

Bibliography
 Munden, Kenneth White. The American Film Institute Catalog of Motion Pictures Produced in the United States, Part 1. University of California Press, 1997.

External links

1929 films
1929 drama films
American drama films
Films directed by Edward Laemmle
1920s English-language films
Universal Pictures films
American black-and-white films
1920s American films